Zabolotny is a surname. Notable people with the surname include:

Anton Zabolotny (born 1991), Russian footballer
Danylo Zabolotny (1866–1929), Ukrainian epidemiologist
Nikolai Zabolotny (born 1990), Russian footballer
Volodymyr Zabolotny (1898–1962), Soviet Ukrainian architect